Lan Xichun (1907–1995) was a surgeon of general surgery and cardio-thoracic surgery. He did the first splenic-renal vein anastomotic operation in China. He improved the operation of cholelithiasis and laid the foundation of hepatobiliary surgery in China. He is also one of the pioneers of cardiovascular surgery. He did the first mitral commissurotomy operation in China. He was also engaged in medical education and brought up a lot of new surgeons. He served as President of Renji Hospital and Shanghai Second Medical College.

External links
兰锡纯——中国胆道与心脏血管外科的主要奠基人  

1907 births
1995 deaths
Chinese surgeons
Cheeloo University alumni
University of Toronto alumni
Academic staff of St. John's University, Shanghai
Academic staff of Shanghai Second Medical University
Chinese medical researchers
Chinese medical academics
People from Yuncheng
Educators from Shanxi
20th-century Chinese physicians
Physicians from Shanxi
Biologists from Shanxi
20th-century surgeons